L (Néry) Battery Royal Horse Artillery is the Tactical Group Battery of 1st Regiment Royal Horse Artillery.

Previous role
The Battery became a Tactical Group Battery in 2005, with its guns firing their last rounds in Otterburn in February 2005.
2006 – L/N (Nery) Battery (The Eagles Troop) RHA split to reform separately as L and N Batteries. N Battery returned to 3 RHA to become their Tactical Group Battery and L Battery became 1 RHA's Tactical Group Battery – supporting the HCR, 1st Mech Bde Formation Reconnaissance Regiment.

Battery structure
L (Nery) Battery are known as a Tactical Group Battery and they consist of approximately 30 personnel:
 Battery Commanders FOO Party 
 FOO Party A - Commanded by the Battery Captain 
 FOO Party B - Commanded by a Captain.
 Battery Commanders Tac Group

Equipment
L (Nery) Battery are currently equipped with CVRT, rather the Warrior OPV. They have Forward Air Controllers in each team.

History

Formation
L (Nery) Battery were formed in India in 1809 as 3rd Troop The Bengal Horse Artillery.

19th century
1857 - The Battery was distinguished with service in the Indian Mutiny, when in action on 7 July 1857, Gunner William Connolly who was repeatedly injured, refused to leave his post on the gun.  He was awarded L Battery's first Victoria Cross.  
1889 - the Battery was renamed L Battery Royal Horse Artillery.

World War One

1914 – L Battery accompanied the BEF to France. 
1914 - The Action at Néry. On the morning of 1 September 1914 the German 4th Cavalry Division attacked 1st Cavalry Brigade and L Battery, who had been camped in the village of Néry.  In the action that followed, L Battery, less for one gun, was all but destroyed.  The 13-pounder gun manned by Captain Bradbury, WO2 Dorrell, Sergeant Nelson, and Gunners Osbourne and Darbyshire, managed to keep the single gun in action against the three German Batteries located a thousand yards away. The Artillery fire put down by this gun allowed the 1st Cavalry Brigade to deliver a successful Counter attack.  For this action Captain Bradbury, WO2 Dorrell, Sergeant Nelson,  were all awarded the Victoria Cross.

World War Two
L (Nery) Battery served with distinction during WW2 in North Africa and Italy.

Cold War
L (Nery) Battery also deployed to Palestine, Malaya, and Cyprus and Northern Ireland.

Recent and current conflicts

Northern Ireland

L (Nery) Battery deployed to Northern Ireland.

Persian Gulf War

Elements of the Battery also served in Operation Granby in the Persian Gulf.

Balkan Wars
1993 – L Battery joined 1 RHA in Assaye Barracks Tidworth Camp when 2 Regt RA (formerly 2 RHA) disbanded.
1999-  The Battery amalgamated with N Battery (The Eagle Troop) RHA to become L/N (Néry) Battery (The Eagle Troop) RHA.  
The Battery served in the Balkans.

Operation TELIC in Iraq

2004 - L / N Battery served in Iraq on Op TELIC 4.

See also

British Army
Royal Artillery
Royal Horse Artillery
List of Royal Artillery Batteries

References

Bibliography

External links
 
 the centenary Commemoration of the Battle of nery

Royal Horse Artillery batteries
Royal Artillery batteries
1809 establishments in British India
Military units and formations established in 1809